IPC is a trade association whose aim is to standardize the assembly and production requirements of electronic equipment and assemblies. It was founded in 1957 as the Institute of Printed Circuits. Its name was later changed to the Institute for Interconnecting and Packaging Electronic Circuits to highlight the expansion from bare boards to packaging and electronic assemblies. In 1999, the organization formally changed its name to IPC with the accompanying tagline, Association Connecting Electronics Industries.

IPC is accredited by the American National Standards Institute (ANSI) as a standards developing organization and is known globally for its standards.  It publishes the most widely used acceptability standards in the electronics industry.

IPC is headquartered in Bannockburn, Illinois, United States with additional offices in Washington, D.C. and Atlanta, Ga. in the United States, and overseas offices in China, Thailand, Vietnam, India and Belgium.

Standards
IPC standards are used by the electronics manufacturing industry. IPC-A-610, Acceptability of Electronic Assemblies, is used worldwide by original equipment manufacturers and EMS companies. There are more than 3600 trainers worldwide who are certified to train and test on the standard. Standards are created by committees of industry volunteers. Task groups have been formed in China, the United States, and Denmark.

Standards published by IPC include:

General documents
 IPC-T-50 Terms and Definitions
 IPC-2615 Printed Board Dimensions and Tolerances
 IPC-D-325 Documentation Requirements for Printed Boards
 IPC-A-31 Flexible Raw Material Test Pattern
 IPC-ET-652 Guidelines and Requirements for Electrical Testing of Unpopulated Printed Boards

Design specifications
 IPC-2612 Sectional Requirements for Electronic Diagramming Documentation (Schematic and Logic Descriptions)
 IPC-2141A Design Guide for High-Speed Controlled Impedance Circuit Boards
 IPC-2221 Generic Standard on Printed Board Design
 IPC-2223 Sectional Design Standard for Flexible Printed Boards
 IPC-2251 Design Guide for the Packaging of High Speed Electronic Circuit
 IPC-7351B Generic Requirements for Surface Mount Design and Land Pattern Standards

Material specifications
 IPC-FC-234 Pressure Sensitive Adhesives Assembly Guidelines for Single-Sided and Double-Sided Flexible Printed Circuits
 IPC-4562 Metal Foil for Printed Wiring Applications
 IPC-4101 Laminate Prepreg Materials Standard for Printed Boards
 IPC-4202 Flexible Base Dielectrics for Use in Flexible Printed Circuitry
 IPC-4203 Adhesive Coated Dielectric Films for Use as Cover Sheets for Flexible Printed Circuitry and Flexible Adhesive Bonding Films
 IPC-4204 Flexible Metal-Clad Dielectrics for Use in Fabrication of Flexible Printed Circuitry

Performance and inspection documents 
 IPC-A-600 Acceptability of Printed Boards
 IPC-A-610 Acceptability of Electronic Assemblies	
 IPC-6011 Generic Performance Specification for Printed Boards
 IPC-6012 Qualification and Performance Specification for Rigid Printed Boards
 IPC-6013 Specification for Printed Wiring, Flexible and Rigid-Flex
 IPC-6018 Qualification and Performance Specification for High Frequency (Microwave) Printed Boards
 IPC- 6202 IPC/JPCA Performance Guide Manual for Single- and Double-Sided Flexible Printed Wiring Boards
 PAS-62123 Performance Guide Manual for Single & Double Sided Flexible Printed Wiring Boards
 IPC-TF-870 Qualification and Performance of Polymer Thick Film Printed Boards

Flex assembly and materials standards
 IPC-FA-251 Assembly Guidelines for Single and Double Sided Flexible Printed Circuits
 IPC-3406 Guidelines for Electrically Conductive Surface Mount Adhesives
 IPC-3408 General Requirements for Anisotropically Conductive Adhesives Films

Market research and statistical data
IPC members are eligible to participate in IPC’s statistical programs, which provide free monthly or quarterly reports for specific industry and product markets.  Statistical programs cover the electronics manufacturing services (EMS), printed circuit board (PCB), laminate, process consumables, solder and assembly equipment segments.

Comprehensive annual reports are distributed for the EMS and PCB segments, covering market size and sales growth, with breakdowns by product type and product mix as well as revenue trends from value-added services, trends in materials, financial metrics, and forecasts for total production in the Americas and the world.

Monthly market reports for the EMS and PCB segments provide recent data on market size, sales and order growth, book-to-bill ratios and near-term forecasts.

IPC APEX EXPO 
IPC organizes IPC APEX EXPO, the largest electronics manufacturing industry trade show in North America, attracting more than 9,000 professionals from 45 countries. In 2020 the show took place in the San Diego Convention Center. IPC Apex Expo 2021 is scheduled for Jan 23-28, also in San Diego.

Notes

External links
 IPC official website
 Document Revision Table, a complete listing of IPC's standards
 Why Should Original Equipment Manufacturers (OEMs) Use IPC Standards? 
 From Vacuum Tubes to Nanotubes: An Amazing Half Century, 1957-2007, history of IPC

Trade associations based in the United States
Standards organizations
Printed circuit board manufacturing
1957 establishments in Illinois